is a junction passenger railway station in Aioi,  Hyōgo Prefecture, Japan, operated by the West Japan Railway Company (JR West).

Lines
It is also a terminus of the 57.4 kilometer Akō Line to

Station layout
Aioi Station has a ground level side platform and a ground-level island platform for normal services, connected by an elevated station building. The Shinkansen portion of the station as two elevated opposed side platforms. The ticket barrier is on the second floor, as are the two exit (South and North). The Sanyo Main Line tracks are on first floor, the Shinkansen tracks are on third floor.

Adjacent stations

|-
!colspan=5|JR West

History
It was renamed 1 October 1942. With the privatization of the Japan National Railways (JNR) on 1 April 1987, the station came under the aegis of the West Japan Railway Company.

Accidents
On 28 October 2008 at 14:42, a person was killed at the station after climbing down from the platform onto the down shinkansen track. The person was hit by the non-stop Nozomi 25 service.

Passenger statistics
In fiscal 2019, the station was used by an average of 4355 passengers daily

Surrounding area
Aioi Municipal Hospital
Japan National Route 250

See also
List of railway stations in Japan

References

External links

 JR West Station Official Site

Railway stations in Hyōgo Prefecture
Sanyō Main Line
Sanyō Shinkansen
Railway stations in Japan opened in 1890
Aioi, Hyōgo